The 1988–89 Iowa Hawkeyes men's basketball team represented the University of Iowa as members of the Big Ten Conference during the 1988–89 NCAA Division I men's basketball season. The team was led by third-year head coach Tom Davis and played their home games at Carver-Hawkeye Arena. They finished the season 23–10 overall and 10–8 in Big Ten play to finish in fourth place. The Hawkeyes received an at-large bid to the NCAA tournament as #4 seed in the East Region. After defeating Rutgers in the first round, they lost to #5 seed NC State in double overtime in the Round of 32.

Roster

Schedule/results

|-
!colspan=8| Non-conference regular season
|-

|-
!colspan=8| Big Ten Regular Season
|-

|-
!colspan=8| NCAA tournament

Rankings

^Coaches did not release a Week 1 poll.

Team players in the 1989 NBA draft

References

Iowa Hawkeyes
Iowa Hawkeyes men's basketball seasons
Hawkeyes
Hawkeyes
Iowa